The following is the qualification system and summary of the sailing at the 2019 Pan American Games competition.

Qualification system
On January 17, 2019, it was announced that an 11th medal event (the 49er for men) was added to the list of medal events, with two additional boats being added in the Nacra 17 event. This meant the total quota rose to 168 sailors and 116 boats overall, with each nation allowed to enter a maximum of 17 athletes. The host nation (Peru) automatically qualified in all eleven events (17 athletes). Each event will have different qualifying events that began in 2017.

Originally, a total of 148 sailors and 106 boats were scheduled to qualify to compete at the games. A nation was allowed to enter a maximum of one boat in each of the ten events and a maximum of 15 athletes.

Qualification summary
The following qualification summary and countries qualified per event are as of May 15, 2019 (after all spots have been allocated). A total of 26 nations qualified for the sailing competitions, the most ever for one single edition of the games.

Qualified boats

RS:X men

Canada declined its quota, and it was awarded to Cuba as a universality spot.

Laser standard men

4 additional universality spots were awarded after reallocation to the last four nations listed above.

49er men

Trinidad and Tobago declined its spot and the two athlete spots were reallocated to the men's laser event.

RS:X women

Only 4 eligible countries competed at the 2018 North American Championship, meaning the last spot is yet to be determined.

Laser radial women

Puerto Rico and Colombia declined their spots. These two spots were awarded as universality spots to Aruba and Antigua and Barbuda

49erFX women

No eligible boat competed in the 2018 South American Championship, therefore the quotas are transferred to the other qualifying tournament.
The eighth boat was reallocated to the Nacra event.
Two additional boat spots were allocated, with two athlete quotas each being reallocated to the laser and laser radial events as universality spots.

Sunfish open

Kites open

For the North American Championship the top four in the men's competition will qualify, along with the top two women. Only one woman competed and was eligible for a spot.
For the South American Championship the top three in the men's competition will qualify, along with the top two women. Only two eligible nations competed at the event.
If a country qualifies in both events, the men's competition will take precedence.
** Antigua and Barbuda was awarded an additional spot as the only non-qualified country at the conclusion of qualifiers.
The last two quotas were reallocated as one boat to the 49er event.

Snipe mixed

Lightning mixed

Nacra 17 mixed

An extra universality spot was awarded as a boat quota was reallocated from the women's 49erfx event.

References

P
P
P
Qualification for the 2019 Pan American Games
Sailing at the 2019 Pan American Games